Fukaura Dam is a concrete gravity dam located in Saga Prefecture in Japan. The dam is used for flood control. The catchment area of the dam is 1.2 km2. The dam impounds about 1  ha of land when full and can store 27 thousand cubic meters of water. The construction of the dam was started on 1977 and completed in 1989.

References

Dams in Saga Prefecture
1989 establishments in Japan